The 1999–2000 NBA season was the Bucks' 32nd season in the National Basketball Association. During the off-season, the Bucks acquired Danny Manning and re-acquired Dale Ellis from the Orlando Magic, and signed free agents Darvin Ham and J.R. Reid. After missing most of the previous season with an ankle injury, Sam Cassell played a full season as the Bucks won their first three games, and played above .500 in the first half of the season, holding a 26–24 record at the All-Star break. However, they struggled in February posting a 3–9 record as Ellis was traded to the Charlotte Hornets, and Haywoode Workman was released to free agency. With less than a month to go, the Bucks playoff chances appeared bleak as they had a 32–37 record in late March. However, down the stretch, they won 10 of their final 13 games to sneak into the playoffs as the #8 seed in the Eastern Conference, finishing fifth in the Central Division with a 42–40 record.

Ray Allen and Glenn Robinson were both selected for the 2000 NBA All-Star Game, which was the first All-Star appearance for both players. Allen averaged 22.1 points and 1.3 steals per game, while Robinson averaged 20.9 points and 6.0 rebounds per game, and Cassell provided the team with 18.2 points, 9.0 assists and 1.3 steals per game. In addition, Tim Thomas played a sixth man role, averaging 11.8 points and 4.2 rebounds per game off the bench, while Scott Williams contributed 7.6 points and 6.6 rebounds per game, and Ervin Johnson provided with 4.8 points, 8.1 rebounds and 1.6 blocks per game.

However, in the Eastern Conference First Round of the playoffs, the Bucks would lose 3–2 to the top-seeded Indiana Pacers, losing Game 5 by just one point, 96–95 at the Conseco Fieldhouse. The Pacers would lose in six games to the Los Angeles Lakers in the NBA Finals.

Following the season, Manning signed as a free agent with the Utah Jazz, while Vinny Del Negro was traded to the Golden State Warriors, and Reid and second-year forward Robert Traylor were both dealt to the Cleveland Cavaliers.

Draft picks

Roster

Roster Notes
 Forward Maceo Baston was signed by the Bucks at the end of the season, but did not play for them.

Regular season

Season standings

z – clinched division title
y – clinched division title
x – clinched playoff spot

Record vs. opponents

Game log

|-style="background:#bbffbb;"
| 1 || November 2, 1999 || @ Houston
| W 98—93
|Sam Cassell (35)
|
|
| Compaq Center14,491
| 1–0
|-style="background:#bbffbb;"
| 2 || November 4, 1999 || @ Atlanta
| W 119—109
|Ray Allen (31)
|
|
| Philips Arena18,514
| 2–0
|-style="background:#bbffbb;"
| 3 || November 6, 1999 || Detroit
| W 121–111
|Sam Cassell (28)
|
|
| Bradley Center18,374
| 3–0
|-style="background:#fcc;"
| 4 || November 8, 1999 || @ New York
| L 101–111
|
|
|
| Madison Square Garden19,763
| 3-1
|-style="background:#fcc;"
| 5 || November 10, 1999 || @ Charlotte
| L 111—117
|
|
|
| Charlotte Coliseum15,769
| 3–2
|-style="background:#bbffbb;"
| 6 || November 12, 1999 || Phoenix
| W 107–92
|Glenn Robinson (27)
|Glenn Robinson (12)
|Sam Cassell (14)
| Bradley Center16,137
| 4–2
|-style="background:#fcc;"
| 7 || November 13, 1999 || @ Cleveland
| L 112—117
|
|
|
| Gund Arena18,640
| 4–3
|-style="background:#bbffbb;"
| 8 || November 16, 1999 || L. A. Clippers
| W 121–111
|Glenn Robinson (24)
|Glenn Robinson (10)
|Sam Cassell (9)
| Bradley Center12,465
| 5–3
|-style="background:#bbffbb;"
| 9 || November 18, 1999 || San Antonio
| W 99–88
|Ray Allen (26)
|Ray Allen, Ervin Johnson (8)
|Glenn Robinson (4)
| Bradley Center15,184
| 6–3
|-style="background:#fcc;"
| 10 || November 20, 1999 || Utah
| L 100–111
|Ray Allen (23)
|Glenn Robinson (8)
|Sam Cassell (9)
| Bradley Center18,027
| 6–4
|-style="background:#fcc;"
| 11 || November 21, 1999 || @ Detroit
| L 94—113
|
|
|
| The Palace of Auburn Hills13,163
| 6–5
|-style="background:#bbffbb;"
| 12 || November 24, 1999 || Chicago
| W 102–95
|
|
|
| Bradley Center14,209
| 7–5
|-style="background:#bbffbb;"
| 13 || November 26, 1999 || @ Boston
| W 114—112
|
|
|
| Fleet Center18,027
| 8–5
|-style="background:#fcc;"
| 14 || November 2, 1999 || Philadelphia
| L 79–82
|
|
|
| Bradley Center15,216
| 8–6

|-style="background:#fcc;"
| 15 || December 2, 1999 || New York
| L 80–84
|
|
|
| Bradley Center14,365
| 8–7
|-style="background:#bbffbb;"
| 16 || December 4, 1999 || @ Chicago
| W 92—91
|
|
|
| United Center22,188
| 9–7
|-style="background:#bbffbb;"
| 17 || December 5, 1999 || Dallas
| W 103–97
|
|
|
| Bradley Center12,214
| 10–7
|-style="background:#fcc;"
| 18 || December 7, 1999 || Detroit
| L 112–116
|
|
|
| Bradley Center12,847
| 10–8
|-style="background:#fcc;"
| 19 || December 8, 1999 || @ New Jersey
| L 98—107
|
|
|
| Continental Airlines Arena12,366
| 10–9
|-style="background:#bbffbb;"
| 20 || December 10, 1999 || @ Toronto
| W 107—91
|
|
|
| Air Canada Centre17,963
| 11–9
|-style="background:#fcc;"
| 21 || December 11, 1999 || Denver
| L 99–101
|
|
|
| Bradley Center15,862
| 11–9
|-style="background:#bbffbb;"
| 22 || December 15, 1999 || @ Orlando
| W 116—99
|
|
|
| Orlando Arena12,308
| 12–10
|-style="background:#bbffbb;"
| 23 || December 16, 1999 || @ Miami
| W 96—95
|
|
|
| Miami Arena14,503
| 13–10
|-style="background:#bbffbb;"
| 24 || December 18, 1999 || Indiana
| W 109–95
|
|
|
| Bradley Center15,236
| 14–10
|-style="background:#fcc;"
| 25 || December 20, 1999 || @ Phoenix
| L 101—108
|
|
|
| America West Arena18,656
| 14–11
|-style="background:#fcc;"
| 26 || December 21, 1999 || @ Sacramento
| L 95—108
|
|
|
| ARCO Arena17,317
| 14–12
|-style="background:#bbffbb;"
| 27 || December 23, 1999 || @ San Antonio
| W 94—91
|
|
|
| Alamodome22,581
| 15–12
|-style="background:#bbffbb;"
| 28 || December 26, 1999 || Miami
| W 93–85
|
|
|
| Bradley Center15,075
| 16–12
|-style="background:#fcc;"
| 29 || December 29, 1999 || @ Charlotte
| L 105—109
|
|
|
| Charlotte Coliseum17,134
| 16–13
|-style="background:#bbffbb;"
| 30 || December 30, 1999 || Cleveland
| W 91–90
|
|
|
| Bradley Center16,329
| 17–13

|-style="background:#fcc;"
| 31 || January 3, 2000 || @ Philadelphia
| L 120—124 OT
|
|
|
| First Union Center14,886
| 17–14
|-style="background:#bbffbb;"
| 32 || January 4, 2000|| Atlanta
| W 116–113
|
|
|
| Bradley Center12,739
| 18–14
|-style="background:#fcc;"
| 33 || January 6, 2000 || @ Detroit
| L 95—101
|
|
|
| The Palace of Auburn Hills14,233
| 18–15
|-style="background:#bbffbb;"
| 34 || January 8, 2000|| Washington
| W 130–129 2OT
|
|
|
| Bradley Center15,612
| 19–15
|-style="background:#bbffbb;"
| 35 || January 10, 2000|| Charlotte
| W 137–87
|
|
|
| Bradley Center13,159
| 20–15
|-style="background:#fcc;"
| 36 || January 12, 2000|| L. A. Lakers
| L 94–103
|
|
|
| Bradley Center18,717
| 20–16
|-style="background:#fcc;"
| 37 || January 14, 2000 || @ Toronto
| L 110—115
|
|
|
| Air Canada Centre19,246
| 20–17
|-style="background:#bbffbb;"
| 38 || January 15, 2000|| Toronto
| W 118–97
|
|
|
| Bradley Center18,717
| 21–17
|-style="background:#bbffbb;"
| 39 || January 17, 2000 || @ Atlanta
| W 107—101
|
|
|
| Philips Arena19,261
| 22–17
|-style="background:#fcc;"
| 40 || January 19, 2000 || @ Indiana
| L 84—106
|
|
|
| Conseco Fieldhouse18,345
| 22–18
|-style="background:#fcc;"
| 41 || January 20, 2000|| Seattle
| L 96–104
|
|
|
| Bradley Center14,087
| 22–19
|-style="background:#bbffbb;"
| 42 || January 26, 2000|| Sacramento
| W 112–104
|
|
|
| Bradley Center16,931
| 23–19

Playoffs

|- align="center" bgcolor="#ffcccc"
| 1
| April 23
| @ Indiana
| L 85–88
| Ray Allen (26)
| Ham, Johnson (8)
| Sam Cassell (6)
| Conseco Fieldhouse18,345
| 0–1
|- align="center" bgcolor="#ccffcc"
| 2
| April 27
| @ Indiana
| W 104–91
| Allen, Cassell (20)
| Ervin Johnson (12)
| Sam Cassell (8)
| Conseco Fieldhouse18,345
| 1–1
|- align="center" bgcolor="#ffcccc"
| 3
| April 29
| Indiana
| L 96–109
| Allen, Robinson (26)
| Ervin Johnson (13)
| Sam Cassell (12)
| Bradley Center18,717
| 1–2
|- align="center" bgcolor="#ccffcc"
| 4
| May 1
| Indiana
| W 100–87
| Allen, Williams (20)
| Ervin Johnson (9)
| Sam Cassell (13)
| Bradley Center18,072
| 2–2
|- align="center" bgcolor="#ffcccc"
| 5
| May 4
| @ Indiana
| L 95–96
| Sam Cassell (22)
| Tim Thomas (9)
| Sam Cassell (6)
| Conseco Fieldhouse18,345
| 2–3
|-

Player statistics

Season

Playoffs

Transactions

Trades

Free agents

Player Transactions Citation:

References

Milwaukee Bucks seasons
Milwaukee
Milwaukee Bucks
Milwaukee Bucks